Sparta is a village in Kent County in the U.S. state of Michigan.  The population was 4,244 at the 2020 census.  The village is located within Sparta Township.

History
The Sparta area was first settled in 1844, with the township formally organized in 1846. The first settler in what is now the village was Jonathan Nash in 1846.  Calling the place Nashville, he built a sawmill on Lick Creek.  Subsequently, he changed the name of the creek to Nash Creek.  Seeing as there was already a Nashville in Michigan, the state legislature suggested Sparta, meaning land of the fair women. The village was platted in 1867 and incorporated in 1883.

During World War II, Sparta was host to a German prisoner of war camp. The POWs were put to work as farmhands because many of the farmhands from the town had left to go fight in the war. The prisoners were treated relatively well, and later even wrote letters to the owner of the farm they worked on saying such things as, "I like to think back on the nice time we could spend on your farm."

Music
In the early to late 1960s, Sparta was home to Fenton Records, an independent record company and recording studio. The label recorded many local bands, as well as other Michigan garage bands. Due to the limited runs of the records, Fenton vinyl 45rpms are highly collectable, often selling for hundreds of dollars each. Many of the records were compiled on a CD called Scream Loud!!!: The Fenton Records Story (Way Back Records).

Geography

The Rogue River flows through the western portion of the village.

Major highways
  runs north–south through the westernmost portion of the village.

Demographics

2010 census
As of the census of 2010, there were 4,140 people, 1,644 households, and 1,059 families living in the village. The racial makeup of the village was 94.5% White, 1.3% African American, 0.4% Native American, 0.5% Asian, 1.6% from other races, and 1.7% from two or more races. Hispanic or Latino of any race were 4.2% of the population.

There were 1,644 households, of which 37.3% had children under the age of 18 living with them, 42.9% were married couples living together, 16.1% had a female householder with no husband present, 5.5% had a male householder with no wife present, and 35.6% were non-families. 30.4% of all households were made up of individuals, and 15.2% had someone living alone who was 65 years of age or older. The average household size was 2.51 and the average family size was 3.12.

The median age in the village was 34 years. 28.5% of residents were under the age of 18; 8.8% were between the ages of 18 and 24; 27.3% were from 25 to 44; 21.7% were from 45 to 64; and 13.8% were 65 years of age or older. The gender makeup of the village was 47.1% male and 52.9% female.

2000 census
As of the census of 2000, there were 4,159 people, 1,618 households, and 1,093 families living in the village. The racial makeup of the village was 95.70% White, 0.63% African American, 0.17% Native American, 0.41% Asian, 1.88% from other races, and 1.23% from two or more races. Hispanic or Latino of any race were 3.58% of the population.

There were 1,618 households, out of which 38.4% had children under the age of 18 living with them, 49.8% were married couples living together, 13.4% had a female householder with no husband present, and 32.4% were non-families. 27.8% of all households were made up of individuals, and 13.0% had someone living alone who was 65 years of age or older.  The average household size was 2.54 and the average family size was 3.11.

In the village, the population was spread out, with 29.7% under the age of 18, 9.4% from 18 to 24, 31.2% from 25 to 44, 16.7% from 45 to 64, and 13.0% who were 65 years of age or older.  The median age was 32 years. For every 100 females, there were 87.3 males.  For every 100 females age 18 and over, there were 81.6 males.

The median income for a household in the village was $39,047, and the median income for a family was $45,822. Males had a median income of $35,000 versus $26,121 for females. The per capita income for the village was $17,920.  About 4.9% of families and 7.2% of the population were below the poverty line, including 9.1% of those under age 18 and 4.6% of those age 65 or over.

Notable people
 Ahmed Fareed, television media personality for NBCSN
 Vivian Martin, stage and silent film actress

References

External links
 Village of Sparta official website

Villages in Kent County, Michigan
Villages in Michigan
Grand Rapids metropolitan area
Populated places established in 1844
1844 establishments in Michigan